The Brockville Ontario Speedway is a 3/8 mile dirt track in the city of Brockville, Ontario, Canada. Commonly known as "The BOS", the track has been running a weekly racing schedule for most summers since 1969. The BOS has also run Go-Karts on Wednesday nights since 2005. They race on a smaller oval on the infield of the track.

History
First opening in 1969 as a 1/4 mile long oval, The BOS ran events every year through to the fall of 1980. A change in ownership and lack of funds forced the speedway to close for the 1981 season, but was brought back to life in 1982. The 1983 season was the first year that the speedway ran under the DIRTcar banner, with Marcel LaFrance being the inaugural DIRTcar Track Champion. After the 1984 season, ownership changed once again and the entire facility was rebuilt. The new grandstands put in that year came from the old Lansdowne Park in Ottawa, Ontario. After the 1987 season, The BOS was again shut down and the track sat dormant for the next four years. In 1992, the track was reopened and ran events for six dates that summer. The very next year saw The BOS run its first full racing season since 1987.

The BOS ran weekly events every Thursday night, but it would change to Friday nights in the early 1990s up to mid-2000s. In 2006, it was announced that the track would race on Saturday evenings, a switch that proved well with an increase in car counts for each division. Over the 2007-08 winter, the speedway had major improvements done to the racing surface, making the corners 25 feet longer at each end. The track is now close to 3/8 of a mile.

For the first time in 2009, The BOS extended its season into October with the DirtCar Northeast Fall Nationals finale. The two-day event was held on Oct. 17 & 18, and included the Mr. Dirt series 358 Modified and Pro Stock tours, as well as Sportsman tour race, 360 Sprint car event and a Street Stock Invitational. Because of the success in 2009, the finale returned in 2010 and was run over three days. The event was sponsored again by DirtCar, and also held the championship finales in Pro-Stocks, Sportsman, and Modifieds. The Big Block Modifieds were also in attendance for the first time. Again the event was successful and it will continue to run every October.

On November 4, 2010, the Brockville & District Chamber of Commerce awarded The BOS with the Small Business of the Year Award, and praised the speedway as "one of the crown jewels of the North American motorsport world."

On July 29, 2011, the prestige World of Outlaws Sprint Car series made its first trip to The BOS during a three-race Canadian tour. Many top-tier sprint drivers including 20-time WoO Sprint Car Champion Steve Kinser, and four-time Champ Donny Schatz were in attendance. Paul McMahan won the inaugural event, after three-time series champ Sammy Swindell had a tire issue with a few laps remaining. 2010 WoO Champion Jason Meyers ran the fastest lap ever recorded on the small track with a time of 10.923 seconds. The series brought in thousands of fans - upwards of 3500 - which is likely the biggest crowd ever to watch an event at the speedway.

The 2014 season saw another first as the track hosted the opening event of the Big Block Modified Super DirtCar Series, the seventh appearance of the series at the facility.

Weekly classes that run at the track include Modified, Sportsman, Rookie Sportsman, Street Stock, Rookies and Crate Sprints. A Vintage Modified class also runs every other week. The Sprint Car division was added in 2021. The track ran a Pro-Stock division from 1994 to 2001. Special shows during the year feature the Big Block Modifieds and Late Models.

Past Track Champions

†Paine drove a Big Block car, and O'Brien drove a Small Block, therefore named champions of each class.

See also
Dirt track racing
Dirt track racing in Canada
Modified stock car racing
Short track motor racing
Auto racing
Race track

External links
 Brockville Speedway Official Site
 Google Map view of Brockville Speedway
 YouTube video of Sportsman racing at The BOS
 History of the Brockville Speedway

References

Motorsport venues in Ontario
Dirt oval racing venues in Canada
Brockville